Virtanen is a lunar impact crater that is located to the northeast of the larger crater Sharonov, and to the east of Anderson. Virtanen lies on the far side of the Moon, and cannot be viewed directly from the Earth.

This crater has a nearly circular rim, with a relatively narrow inner wall and a small rise near the interior midpoint. A small crater Virtanen F near the eastern rim lies at the focus of a small ray system that covers much of Virtanen and its surroundings. The rays are wispy in nature and somewhat asymmetrical, with the distribution being much more expansive to the west. At the origin of the rays is a bright patch of higher-albedo surface.

The crater lies within the Freundlich-Sharonov Basin.

Satellite craters
By convention these features are identified on lunar maps by placing the letter on the side of the crater midpoint that is closest to Virtanen.

References

 
 
 
 
 
 
 
 

Impact craters on the Moon